Below is a list of buildings in Dubai. Dubai has a varied set of buildings and structures in different architectural styles. Many modern interpretations of Islamic architecture can be found here due to a boom in construction and architectural innovation in the Arab World in general, and in Dubai in particular, supported not only by leading Arab or international architectural and engineering design firms such as Al Hashemi and Aedas, but also by top firms of New York and Chicago in the United States. As a result of this boom, modern Islamic – and world – architecture has been taken to new levels in skyscraper building design and technology.

Buildings in Dubai

Dubai International Airport
 Dubai International Airport
 Dubai International Airport Cargo Gateway

In Dubai Media City
The following are buildings in Dubai Media City, a tax-free zone within Dubai:
 AAM Tower
 Al Kazim Towers
 Al Salam Tecom Tower
 Dubai Pearl
 Emirates Airlines Staff Accommodation – a 29-floor tower in the Dubai Media City. Construction of the Emirates Airlines Staff Accommodation was completed in 2008.
 The One Tower

Hotels

 Address Boulevard
 Address Downtown 
 Atlantis The Palm
 Burj Al Arab
 Carlton Downtown
 Conrad Dubai 
 Dubai Marriott Harbour Hotel & Suites
 The Fairmont Palm Hotel & Resort 
 Four Points by Sheraton, Dubai
 Four Seasons Resort at Jumeirah Beach
 Four Seasons DIFC
 Gevora Hotel
 Grand Hyatt Dubai 
 Gucci Hotel (Dubai) 
 Hatta Fort Hotel 
 Hyatt Regency Dubai 
 Hydropolis
 Iranian Club, Dubai
 Jumeirah (hotel chain) 
 Jumeirah Beach Hotel 
 Jumeirah Emirates Towers Hotel
 Jumeirah Zabeel Saray 
 JW Marriott Marquis Dubai
 Kempinski Hotel Mall of the Emirates 
 Madinat Jumeirah
 Marina 101
 Paramount Hotel Dubai
 Palazzo Versace Dubai 
 Radisson Royal Dubai
 Rose Rayhaan by Rotana
 Shangri-La Hotel
 Tamani Hotel Marina 
 Waldorf Astoria Dubai Palm Jumeirah
 Metropolitan Hotel Dubai
 JW Marriott Marquis Hotel Dubai
 ME Dubai
 Jumeirah Emirates Towers
 Taj Dubai
 The H Dubai
 FORM Hotel Dubai, a member of Design Hotels™
 Dusit Thani Dubai
 Palm Beach Hotel Bur Dubai
 Hotel Raffles Dubai
 Address Downtown
 Jumeirah Beach Hotel
 Armani Hotel
 Radisson Blu Hotel, Dubai Waterfront
 Holiday Inn Bur Dubai - Embassy District
 Click City Hotel Deira
 Hyatt Regency Dubai
 Sofitel Dubai Downtown
 Fairmont Dubai
 Dubai Hotel
 Burj Al Arab
 The Tower Plaza Hotel Dubai
 Dorus Hotel (Formerly Montreal Hotel Dubai)
 W Dubai - The Palm
 Avenue Hotel
 Atana Hotel
 Hotel RIU Dubai
 Moscow Hotel
 Aravi Hotel
 Radisson Blu Hotel, Dubai Deira Creek
 Riviera Hotel Dubai
 Sheraton Mall of the Emirates Hotel, Dubai
 Shangri-La Dubai
 Sport Hotel
 Seattle Hotel Deira Dubai
 Miami Hotel
 Rove Downtown
 La Quinta by Wyndham Dubai Jumeirah
 Address Dubai Mall
 Broadway Club 1 Dubai
 La Ville Hotel & Suites City Walk, Dubai, Autograph Collection
 Radisson Blu Hotel, Dubai Canal View
 Copthorne Hotel Dubai
 The Dubai Edition
 Florida Hotel Dubai
 The Oberoi, Dubai
 Radisson Blu Hotel, Dubai Media City
 Cassells Al Barsha Hotel
 Palazzo Versace Dubai at Jaddaf Waterfront
 Vida Downtown
 Comfort Inn Hotel, Dubai
 City Avenue Hotel
 Swissôtel Al Murooj Dubai
 The Meydan Hotel
 Gateway Hotel
 Crowne Plaza Dubai Apartments
 Mandarin Oriental Jumeira, Dubai
 Grand Hyatt Dubai
 LONDON CITY HOTEL
 Palace Downtown
 Deira Palace Hotel
 Asiana Hotel Dubai
 Sun City International Hotel
 Mövenpick Hotel & Apartments Bur Dubai
 The View Al Barsha Hotel Apartments
 Florida Square Hotel
 Media One Hotel
 Jumeirah Creekside Hotel

Hospitals

 Al Jalila Children's Specialty Hospital
 Dubai Hospital
 Iranian Hospital, Dubai
 Rashid Hospital
 Latifa Hospital

Developments

 Deira Islands
 Dubai Marina
 Jumeirah Islands
 Palm Islands
 The Universe
 The World

Mosques
 Al Farooq Omar Bin Al Khattab Mosque
 Grand Mosque
 Iranian Mosque, Bur Dubai
 Iranian Mosque, Satwa
 Jumeirah Mosque
 Masjid Al Rahim

Museums and attractions

 Al Ahmadiya School
 Dubai Moving Image Museum
 Dubai Museum
 Etihad Museum
 Museum of the Future
 The Green Planet
 Saeed Al Maktoum House
 Salsali Private Museum
 Sheikh Obaid bin Thani House
 The Mine

Resorts

 Atlantis, The Palm
 Country Spa
 Deira Island
 Dubai Parks and Resorts
 Jumeirah Zabeel Saray
 Madinat Jumeirah
 Palm Grandeur
 Palm Islands
 Palm Jebel Ali
 Ski Dubai

Restaurants
 Iranian Club, Dubai
 Mirchi
 Rustar Floating Restaurant
 Verre

Schools

 Al Ameen School
 Al-Mizhar American Academy
 Arab Unity School
 Buds Public School, Dubai
 Cambridge International School, Dubai
 Clarion School
 DPS Academy
 Dubai English Speaking College
 Dubai International Academy
 Dubai International School
 Dubai Modern High School
 Dubai National School, Al Barsha
 Dubai National School, Al Twar
 Dubai Scholars Private School
 Dwight School Dubai
 Emirates International School
 English College Dubai
 English Language School, Dubai
 Gems New Millennium School
 GEMS World Academy
 Greenfield Community School
 Greenwood International School
 Gulf Indian High School
 The Indian High School, Dubai
 JSS Private School
 Jumeira Baccalaureate School
 Jumeirah College
 Jumeirah English Speaking School
 Latifa School for Girls
 New Indian Model School
 Our Own High School
 Rashid School For Boys
 St. Mary's Catholic High School, Dubai, UAE
 Springdales School, Dubai
 Pakistan Educational Academy, Dubai, UAE https://www.pea.ae

International school students

Universities and colleges

 Dubai International Academic City 
 Al Falah University 
 Al Ghurair University 
 American University in Dubai 
 American University in the Emirates 
 Birla Institute of Technology and Science, Pilani – Dubai Campus 
 British University in Dubai 
 Canadian University of Dubai 
 College of Islamic and Arabic Studies (Dubai) 
 Dubai Medical College 
 Dubai Men's College 
 Dubai Pharmacy College 
 Dubai School of Dental Medicine 
 Mohammed bin Rashid School of Government 
 ENGECON Dubai 
 Hamdan Bin Mohammed Smart University 
 Heriot-Watt University Dubai 
 Hult International Business School
 Institute of Management Technology, Dubai 
 International Horizons College 
 Mahatma Gandhi University
 Manipal University Dubai
 Murdoch University Dubai
 Rochester Institute of Technology of Dubai
 Saint Joseph University - Dubai
 Saint-Petersburg State Economic University (Dubai branch)
 Shaheed Zulfikar Ali Bhutto Institute of Science and Technology
 MODUL University Dubai
 Synergy University
 Synergy University Dubai Campus
 University of Dubai
 University of Wollongong in Dubai
 Zayed University

Shopping malls

 Arabian Center 
 BurJuman 
 City Center Me'aisem 
 City Centre Deira 
 City Centre Mirdif
 Dragon Mart
 Dubai Festival City
 Dubai Marina Mall
 Dubai Outlet Mall 
 Ibn Battuta Mall 
 Mall of Arabia (Dubai) 
 Mall of the Emirates 
 Mall of the World
 Mercato Shopping Mall 
 Mohammed bin Rashid City 
 The Dubai Mall 
 Wafi City 
 The Walk (Jumeirah Beach Residence)

Skyscrapers

 1 Park Avenue 
 AAM Tower 
 The Address the BLVD 
 AG Tower 
 Al Attar Business Tower 
 Al Hekma Tower 
 Al Kazim Towers 
 Al Salam Tecom Tower 
 Al Wasl Tower 
 Al Yaqoub Tower 
 Almas Tower 
 Anara Tower 
 Armada Towers 
 Bay Central 
 Bin Manana Twin Towers 
 The Binary (Dubai) 
 Boulevard Plaza 
 Rosewood Dubai 
 Burj Al Arab 
 Burj Al Salam 
 Burj Jumeirah 
 Burj Khalifa 
 Burj Park III
 Burj Vista 
 Burj 2020 
 Burjuman Residences
 Chelsea Tower 
 Concorde Tower 
 Deira Twin Towers 
 DIFC Tower 
 Downtown Dubai 
 Dream Tower, Dubai 
 Dubai Beachfront Hotel 
 Dubai City Tower 
 Dubai Islamic Bank Tower 
 Dubai Marriott Harbour Hotel & Suites 
 Dubai Meydan City 
 Dubai Mixed-Use Towers 
 Dubai One Tower 
 Dubai Pearl
 Dubai Towers Dubai 
 Dubai World Trade Centre 
 Duja Tower 
 Emirates Office Tower 
 Emirates Towers 
 Entisar Tower 
 EP 07 Tower 
 EP 09 Towers 
 Escan Tower 
 Etisalat Tower 1 
 The Exchange (Dubai) 
 Executive Towers 
 Fortune Araames 
 Forte
 The Forum (Dubai) 
 Four Points by Sheraton Sheikh Zayed Road Dubai
 Gevora Hotel
 The Grand Boulevard Tower 
 HHHR Tower 
 ICD Brookfield 
 I-Rise 
 The Index (Dubai) 
 Il Primo 
 Iris Bay (Dubai) 
 IRIS Mist 
 JB Tower 
 Jumeirah Al Khor 
 Jumeirah Bay 
 Jumeirah Beach Residence 
 Jumeirah Business Center 1 
 Jumeirah Business Center Towers 
 JW Marriott Marquis Dubai 
 Khalid Al Attar Tower 2 
 Lake Shore Towers 
 La Maison by HDS 
 Lighthouse Tower 
 LIWA Heights 
 The Mansion at Burj Khalifa 
 Marina 106 
 Marina Arcade 
 Marina Promenade 
 MarinaScape 
 Mazaya Business Avenue 
 Meraas Tower 
 Nakheel Tower 
 National Bank of Dubai (building) 
 Nili Tower 
 O-14 (Dubai) 
 O2 Residence 
 The Oberoi Business Bay 
 The One Tower 
 One Za'abeel
 Orra Marina 
 The Palladium (Dubai) 
 Park Lane Tower (Dubai) 
 Park Place (Dubai) 
 The Peninsula (Dubai) 
 Pier 8 
 The Palm Tower
 The Palm Gateway
 The Residences 
 Rolex Tower 
 Rose Rayhaan by Rotana 
 Saba Tower 1 
 Saba Tower 4 
 Shangri-La Hotel (Dubai) 
 The Sheffield Tower 
 Signature Towers 
 Sky Gardens 
 The Skyscraper (Dubai) 
 SLS Dubai Hotel & Residences
 Starhill Tower 
 Tiara United Towers 
 The Tower (Dubai) 
 The Tower at Dubai Creek Harbour
 Vida Residence Downtown Dubai
 Vida Zabeel
 Verde Residences and Offices 
 Vision Tower 
 Vue De Lac 
 The Wave Tower 
 World Trade Centre Residence

Skyscraper hotels

 Angsana Hotel & Suites 
 Atlantis, The Palm 
 Burj Al Arab 
 Burj Khalifa 
 Ciel Tower
 Emirates Towers 
 Four Points by Sheraton Sheikh Zayed Road Dubai 
 Gevora Hotel
 Grand Fort Hotel
 Grosvenor House (Dubai) 
 Jumeirah Emirates Towers Hotel 
 JW Marriott Marquis Dubai 
 Marina 101 
 Paramount Tower Hotel & Residences
 The Palm Tower
 Rose Rayhaan by Rotana 
 Shangri-La Hotel (Dubai) 
 SLS Dubai Hotel & Residences
 Tamani Hotel Marina
 Trump International Hotel & Tower (Dubai)

Residential skyscrapers

 21st Century Tower 
 23 Marina 
 The Address Downtown Dubai 
 Al Fattan Marine Towers 
 Al Rostamani Maze Tower 
 Al Seef Towers 
 Al Tayer Tower 
 Angsana Hotel & Suites 
 Burj Khalifa 
 Cayan Tower 
 Central Park Towers 
 D1 (building) 
 DAMAC Residenze 
 DAMAC Maison-Paramount Tower 1 
 DAMAC Maison-Paramount Tower 2 
 DAMAC Maison-Paramount Tower 3 
 DAMAC Paramount Hotel & Residences 
 Dubai One Tower
 Elite Residence 
 Elite Towers 
 Emirates Crown 
 Grosvenor House (Dubai) 
 La Maison by HDS 
 Marina 1 
 Marina 101 
 Marina Pinnacle 
 The Marina Torch 
 Millennium Tower (Dubai) 
 Moving skyscraper 
 Ocean Heights (Dubai) 
 Pentominium 
 Princess Tower 
 Sama Tower 
 Sulafa Tower 
 Tamani Hotel Marina 
 The Tower at Dubai Creek Harbour 
 Ubora Towers 
 Verde Residences and Offices

Sports venues

 Aviation Club Tennis Centre 
 DSC Hockey Stadium 
 DSC Indoor Arena 
 DSC Multi-Purpose Stadium 
 Dubai Autodrome 
 Dubai Cricket Council Ground No 1 
 Dubai Cricket Council Ground No 2 
 Dubai Exiles Rugby Ground 
 Dubai International Cricket Stadium 
 Emirates Golf Club 
 Hamdan Sports Complex 
 ICC Academy Ground 
 Iranian Club, Dubai 
 Jumeirah Golf Estates 
 List of sports venues in Dubai 
 Al-Maktoum Stadium 
 Maktoum Bin Rashid Al Maktoum Stadium 
 Meydan Racecourse 
 Police Officers' Club Stadium 
 Al-Rashid Stadium 
 The Sevens Stadium 
 Zabeel Stadium

Dubai Sports City
 Dubai Sports City
 DSC Hockey Stadium
 DSC Indoor Arena
 Dubai Cricket Council Ground No 1
 Dubai International Cricket Stadium
 ICC Academy
 ICC Academy Ground

Buildings under construction

 Ain Dubai
 Al Habtoor City 
 Al Hekma Tower 
 Al safa residential development 
 Al Maktoum International Airport
 Arabian Canal 
 Bay Central 
 Bayside Residence 
 The Binary (Dubai) 
 Bluewaters Island
 Rosewood Dubai 
 Burj Al Salam 
 DAMAC Maison-Paramount Tower 1 
 DAMAC Maison-Paramount Tower 2 
 DAMAC Maison-Paramount Tower 3 
 DAMAC Paramount Hotel & Residences 
 Downtown Dubai 
 Dubai Central Library 
 Dubai Harbour
 Dubai Industrial Park 
 Dubai Islamic Bank Tower 
 Dubai Maritime City 
 Dubai Meydan City 
 Dubai Outlet City 
 Dubai TechnoPark 
 Dubai Waterfront 
 Duja Tower 
 Elite Towers 
 Emirates Financial Towers 
 The Exchange (Dubai) 
 F1-X Dubai 
 The Forum (Dubai) 
 IMG Worlds of Adventure 
 Iris Bay (Dubai) 
 Jumeirah Al Khor 
 Jumeirah Garden City 
 The Mansion at Burj Khalifa 
 Marina 101 
 Marina 106 
 Mazaya Business Avenue 
 Mohammad bin Rashid Gardens 
 Nakheel Mall
 O2 Residence 
 The Oberoi Business Bay
 One Zabeel 
 OQYANA World First 
 Orra Marina 
 Palm Islands 
 Palm Jebel Ali 
 Park Lane Tower (Dubai) 
 The Peninsula (Dubai) 
 Pentominium 
 Pier 8 
 Porto Dubai
 Vida Residence Downtown Dubai
 Vida Zabeel

Proposed buildings

 1 Park Avenue 
 Al wasl development 
 Aladdin City, Dubai 
 Anara Tower
 Bawadi 
 Burj Al Fattan 
 Burj al-Taqa 
 Burj Park III 
 Culture Village 
 DAMAC Residenze 
 Deira Island 
 DIFC Tower 
 Dubai Beachfront Hotel 
 Dubai Central Library 
 Dubai City Tower 
 Dubai Creek Cultural Project 
 Dubai Food City 
 Dubai Golf City 
 Elite Towers 
 Entisar Tower 
 EP 07 Tower 
 Falconcity of Wonders 
 Flamingo creek 
 The Grand Boulevard Tower 
 Hydropolis – a proposed hotel
 JB Tower 
 Jebel Ali Seaplane Base 
 Jumeirah Business Center 1 
 Jumeirah Business Center Towers 
 Mall of Arabia (Dubai) 
 Marina Arcade 
 Nili Tower 
 OQYANA World First 
 P-17 (Dubai) 
 Paramount theme park Dubai 
 Pentominium 
 Saadiyat Island 
 The Needle
 The Sheffield Tower 
 Signature Towers 
 Verde Residences and Offices 
 The Wave Tower 
 The World (archipelago)
 Ziggurat Pyramid, Dubai – a pyramid-shaped arcology that was conceived for Dubai in 2008. It was estimated to start construction in 2021, and It will be completed by 2028.

Cancelled buildings
 Burj Al Alam
 Lighthouse Tower
 Nakheel Tower
 S Residence by Immo
 Trump International Hotel and Tower (Dubai)

Miscellaneous

 Al Sahab Tower 2 – a 44-floor residential tower comprising part of the Al Sahab Towers complex in the Dubai Marina in Dubai. Construction of the Al Sahab Tower 2 was completed in 2004.
 B2B Tower – a 20-floor tower in the Business Bay in Dubai, United Arab Emirates. 
 Dubai Chamber of Commerce and Industry (building)
 Deira Clocktower
 Dubai Creek Tower
 Dubai Dolphinarium
 Dubai Drydocks
 Dubai International City – a country-themed architecture of residences, business, and tourist attractions, spreading over an area of 800 hectares (8 million square meters).
 Dubai International Convention Centre
 Dubai International Financial Centre
 Dubai Internet City
 Dubai Knowledge Village
 Dubai Opera
 Dubai Science Park
 Dubai Silicon Oasis
 Emirates Institute for Banking and Financial Studies
 Hatta Heritage Village
 Heritage Village Dubai
 Hindu Temple, Dubai
 Jumeirah Lake Towers
 Majlis Ghorfat Umm Al Sheif – a preserved building built in 1955 that was a home of Sheikh Rashid bin Saeed Al Maktoum, where he used to spend afternoons during summer
 Marina Quays
 Markaz, Dubai
 One Business Bay 
 Ontario Tower – a 29-floor tower developed by Rose Homes Investments in the Business Bay in Dubai.  Construction of the Ontario Tower was completed in 2011.
 The Regal Tower – a 33-floor tower developed by Tameer located in the Business Bay, Dubai. Construction of Regal Tower was completed in 2012.
 Sheikh Mohammed Centre for Cultural Understanding
 Tashkeel Dubai

Gallery

See also

 Geography of Dubai
 Jumeirah Lakes Towers Free Zone
 List of real estate in Dubai
 List of tallest residential buildings in Dubai
 List of tallest buildings in the United Arab Emirates
 The Dubai Fountain – the world's largest choreographed fountain system

References

Further reading

External links
 

Buildings and structures in Dubai
Dubai
Buildings